The Samuel Holmes House is a historic house at 2693 Sheridan Road in Highland Park, Illinois. Built in 1926, the Shingle style house was designed by architect Robert Seyfarth. The house is one of several Seyfarth-designed buildings in Highland Park and a rare example of the Shingle style in the city. The house's design includes an asymmetrical form, a gable roof with inset dormers, and a cedar shake sided exterior. Noted landscape architect Jens Jensen designed the house's grounds.

The house was added to the National Register of Historic Places on September 29, 1982.

References

National Register of Historic Places in Lake County, Illinois
Houses on the National Register of Historic Places in Illinois
Shingle Style architecture in Illinois
Houses completed in 1926
Highland Park, Illinois
1926 establishments in Illinois